William Bryant Cooper (1867–1959) was the 14th Lieutenant Governor of North Carolina from 1921 to 1925 serving under Governor Cameron Morrison. 

Cooper was born in Cool Spring, South Carolina, on January 22, 1867. He became a prominent banker and businessman in New Hanover County, North Carolina, serving as president of the Wilmington Chamber of Commerce and mayor pro tem from 1902 to 1903.

A Democrat, Cooper was elected over Fordyce C. Harding in the 1920 Democratic primary election and over Republican Irvin B. Tucker and Socialist H.C. Beuck in the general election. Under the state constitution of the time, he was not eligible to run for another term.

References

Additional reading 
OurCampaigns.com
Gore-Cooper Family Papers
William Bryant Cooper/Frances Ada Gore Family

1867 births
1959 deaths
Lieutenant Governors of North Carolina
People from Wilmington, North Carolina
North Carolina Democrats